Lutécia is a municipality in the state of São Paulo in Brazil. The population is 2,636 (2020 est.) in an area of 475 km². The elevation is 581 m.

References

Municipalities in São Paulo (state)